Arthur Carl Johann Wittmaack (2 June 1878 – 30 October 1965) was a Danish architect. His work was part of the architecture event in the art competition at the 1928 Summer Olympics.

Biography
Wittmaack was born in  Malmø, Sweden. He was the son of Johannes Wittmaack and Adamine Petersen.
Wittmaack studied at the Academy of Fine Arts Vienna from 1899-1900.  He joined the firm of  Vilhelm Hvalsøe  from 1916. His earliest designs were of Neoclassical architecture, while the later works were representative of functionalism.

He exhibited at Charlottenborg Spring Exhibition (1917), at  Stockholm (1918) and at the Brussels International Exposition (1935). He also exhibited in Oslo, Berlin, Paris and the Netherlands.

He was married in 1910  with  Emilie Katarine Wittmaack (1884-1974). He died during 1965 in the United States.

Selected designs
Axelborg on Vesterbrogade in Copenhagen 
Absalon's Church  in the Absalons parish  of Copenhagen
Helleruplund Church  in the Diocese of Helsingør in Copenhagen

References

1878 births
1965 deaths
People from Malmö
Academy of Fine Arts Vienna alumni
19th-century Danish architects
20th-century Danish architects
Olympic competitors in art competitions